Daemilus rufapex is a moth of the family Tortricidae. It is found in Vietnam.

The wingspan is 20 mm. The ground colour of the forewings is brownish ferruginous suffused with greyish (especially in the distal third) and rust brown in dorsal third. The strigulation (fine streaking) is brown. The hindwings are glossy brown.

Etymology
The name refers to the colouration of the forewing apex and is derived from Latin rufus (meaning rust).

References

Moths described in 2009
Archipini
Moths of Asia
Taxa named by Józef Razowski